This is a list of ambassadors to Poland. Note that some ambassadors are responsible for more than one country while others are directly accredited to Warsaw.

Current Foreign Ambassadors to Poland

See also
List of current ambassadors from Poland

References

External links
Ministry of Foreign Affairs of the Republic of Poland. ORDER OF PRECEDENCE OF HEADS OF MISSIONS
Heads and diplomatic staff of diplomatic missions of foreign states in the Republic of Poland. DIPLOMATIC MISSIONS A – F
Heads and diplomatic staff of diplomatic missions of foreign states in the Republic of Poland. DIPLOMATIC MISSIONS G – L
Heads and diplomatic staff of diplomatic missions of foreign states in the Republic of Poland. DIPLOMATIC MISSIONS M – S
Heads and diplomatic staff of diplomatic missions of foreign states in the Republic of Poland. DIPLOMATIC MISSIONS T - Z

Poland
 

es:Anexo:Embajadores acreditados en Polonia
pl:Placówki dyplomatyczne i konsularne w Polsce: A